Therapont, Therapontos (Θεράποντος,  also Therapontus, Ferapont) is a Greek given name. "Therapontos" is genitive for therapon.

"Therapontos" also may be usead as a surname.

"Ferapont" was a common Russian name of Russian Orthodox tradition, defined in the liturgical calendar as "worshipper, servant, caretaker, companion, etc."

The name may refer to:

Therapont of White Lake (1331-1426)
Therapont of Sardis (cca 259)
Therapont of Cyprus (3rd century)

Prodromos Therapontos, a footballer

References

Greek masculine given names